Helen Marie Marshall (nee Sargent September 30, 1929 – March 4, 2017) was an American politician from New York City. She was Borough President of Queens from 2002 - 2013. She was also the first African-American Borough President of Queens.

Biography
Marshall was born on  September 30, 1929, in the Bronx, having been raised in between both Harlem and the Bronx. Both of her parents were immigrants of African descent from British Guiana (now Guyana).

She graduated with a B.A. in education from CUNY Queens College. She was a teacher for eight years. In 1969, she left teaching to become the first Director of the Langston Hughes Library in Queens. She was married to Donald Edward Marshall until his death; they had two children, Donald Jr. and Agnes Marie. She entered politics as a Democrat. She was a member of the New York State Assembly for eight years and a member of the New York City Council for ten.

She was elected as Borough President of Queens in November 2001, to succeed the term-limited Claire Shulman. As Borough President, Marshall made marketing Queens as a tourist destination one of her priorities. In 2005, she won a second term, defeating her Republican/Conservative challenger Philip T. Sica with 75% of the vote to his 25%. She was inaugurated to her second term as President of the Borough of Queens on January 3, 2006, in a ceremony held at Terrace on the Park in Flushing Meadows Corona Park. Marshall outlined her plans for the next four years including health care, education, housing and new park projects. In November 2009, Marshall was re-elected to a third term.

Death
Marshall died on March 4, 2017, at her home in Palm Desert, California, aged 87. A widow, she was survived by her two children.

References

External links

1929 births
2017 deaths
Queens borough presidents
New York City Council members
Democratic Party members of the New York State Assembly
1992 United States presidential electors
2000 United States presidential electors
American people of Guyanese descent
African-American New York City Council members
African-American women in politics
Afro-Guyanese
Afro-Guyanese people
Queens College, City University of New York alumni
Women state legislators in New York (state)
Women New York City Council members
20th-century American women politicians
20th-century American politicians
Politicians from the Bronx
21st-century American women politicians
20th-century African-American women
20th-century African-American politicians
21st-century African-American women
21st-century African-American politicians
21st-century American politicians